Shahrah may refer to:
 Shahrah, Razavi Khorasan
 Shah Rah, Razavi Khorasan Province
 Shahrah, South Khorasan